Johan Peder Olsen (born August 14, 1939) is a Norwegian political scientist, and professor emeritus in political science at the University of Bergen, known for his work on new institutionalism.

Life and work 
Olsen obtained his MA in political science, with a minor in economics and political history, at the University of Oslo in 1967. In 1971 he obtained his PhD at the University of Bergen. He obtained an honorary doctorate from the Åbo Akademi, Finland in, 1988, and from the University of Copenhagen in 1990.

Olsen has started his career as journalist and reporter for various Norwegian newspapers from 1958 to 1963. He started his academic career as research assistant at the Institute of Political Science of the University of Oslo in 1965. In 1969 he was appointed assistant professor at the Institute of Sociology of the University of Bergen, in 1970 associate professor, and in 1973 professor in public administration and organization theory until 1993.

Olsen was also member of the Norwegian Research Council, and a member of the Norwegian Academy of Science and Letters. He established ARENA (Advanced Research on the Europeanization of the Nation State) in 1994. He was research director at ARENA for many years, and is now.

Olsen is one of the developers of the systemic-anarchic perspective of organizational decision-making known as the Garbage Can Model.

Selected publications

Books 
 March, James G. and Johan P. Olsen, (eds.). Ambiguity and Choice in Organizations, Bergen Universitetsforlaget, 1976.
 March, James G. & Johan P. Olsen. Rediscovering Institutions: The Organizational Basis of Politics. New York: The Free Press, 1989
 Brunsson, Nils & Johan P. Olsen. The Reforming Organization. London: Routledge, 1993.
 March, James G. & Johan P. Olsen. Democratic Governance. New York: The Free Press, 1995.
 Brunsson, Nils & Johan P. Olsen (eds.).  Organizing Organizations. Bergen-Sandviken, Norway: Fagbokförlaget, 1998.

Articles 
 Cohen, Michael D., James G. March, and Johan P. Olsen "A Garbage Can Model of Organizational Choice". Administrative Science Quarterly, 17 (l) (1972): p. 1-25
 March, James G., and Johan P. Olsen. "The new institutionalism: organizational factors in political life." American Political Science Review, 7 (3) (1983): 734-749.

References

External links

Johan P. Olsen CV

1939 births
Living people
Norwegian business theorists
Norwegian political scientists
Public administration scholars
Members of the Norwegian Academy of Science and Letters
Foreign associates of the National Academy of Sciences